Moisés Salvador Pérez Hellburg is a Venezuelan Greco-Roman wrestler. He won the silver medal in the 130 kg event at the 2019 Pan American Games held in Lima, Peru. In the final, he lost against Mijaín López of Cuba.

At the 2020 Pan American Wrestling Championships held in Ottawa, Canada, he won one of the bronze medals in the 130 kg event. He also competed in the 2020 Pan American Wrestling Olympic Qualification Tournament, also held in Ottawa, Canada, without qualifying for the 2020 Summer Olympics. In May 2021, he also failed to qualify for the Olympics at the World Olympic Qualification Tournament held in Sofia, Bulgaria as he was eliminated in his first match by Arata Sonoda of Japan.

Major results

References

External links 
 

Living people
Year of birth missing (living people)
Place of birth missing (living people)
Venezuelan male sport wrestlers
Pan American Games medalists in wrestling
Pan American Games silver medalists for Venezuela
Medalists at the 2019 Pan American Games
Wrestlers at the 2019 Pan American Games
Central American and Caribbean Games bronze medalists for Venezuela
Competitors at the 2018 Central American and Caribbean Games
Central American and Caribbean Games medalists in wrestling
Pan American Wrestling Championships medalists
Wrestlers at the 2015 Pan American Games
21st-century Venezuelan people